The Weaker Sex is a 1917 American silent drama film directed by Raymond B. West and starring Dorothy Dalton, Louise Glaum and Charles Ray.

Cast
 Dorothy Dalton as Ruth Tilden 
 Louise Glaum as Annette Loti 
 Charles Ray as Jack Harding 
 Robert McKim as Raoul Bozen 
 Charles K. French as John Harding 
 Margaret Thompson as Marjory Lawton 
 J. Barney Sherry as Edward Tilden 
 Nona Thomas as Mary Wheeler 
 John Gilbert as Minor role

References

Bibliography
 Golden, Eve. John Gilbert: The Last of the Silent Film Stars. University Press of Kentucky, 2013.

External links
 

1917 films
1917 drama films
1910s English-language films
American silent feature films
Silent American drama films
Films directed by Raymond B. West
American black-and-white films
Triangle Film Corporation films
1910s American films